Raavi is an Indian drama television series which premiered on 9 September 2013. It airs on Big Magic through Monday to Friday. The show stars Rimmi Srivastav and  Rashmi Singh.

Plot
Raavi is a story of a girl who grows up disguised like a boy named Ravinder in a Punjabi family. She discovers a magic mobile and use it for people's good . The whole story revolves around how she saves the mobile from going into wrong hands. She lives in Dharam pura, Punjab

Cast
 Rucha Gujarathi as Scientist Falaq
Rimmi Srivastav as Raavi/Ravinder
Rashmi Singh /Gauri Singh/Preeti Gandwani as Amrita (Raavi's Mother)
Govind Pandey as Amrita`s father-in-law
Karan Singh Chhabra as Police Officer
soneer vadhera as jasbeer
Aryan Prajapati as Aman
M. M. Faruqui as kaaleshwar
Musharraf Rahman Khan as Mr. Sinha
Chandraprakash Thakur/ Vinod Kapoor as Shamsher
Saloni Daini as Cameo

References

Indian drama television series
Big Magic original programming
2013 Indian television series debuts
Television shows set in Punjab, India